COVID-19 vaccination in France started on 27 December 2020 after the approval of Pfizer–BioNTech COVID-19 vaccine by the European Union commission.

According to a June 2022 study published in The Lancet, COVID-19 vaccination in France prevented an additional 631,000 deaths from December 8, 2020, to December 8, 2021.

Vaccines on order 
There are several COVID-19 vaccines at various stages of development around the world.

Vaccines in trial stage

Vaccination strategy 
The vaccination strategy put in place by the government has three principal objectives:
 Reduce mortality and severe forms of the disease
 Protect caregivers and the healthcare system
 Ensure vaccine and immunization safety
The vaccine is planned to be distributed in five phases.

Phase 1 

The first phase of vaccination concerns the highest-priority audiences. Since 27 December 2020, it initially concerned nursing home and ESMS residents and staff over the age of 50. Vaccination has been open to caregivers over 50 since 2 January 2021, then to firefighters and domestic caregivers over 50 since 5 January 2021.

Phase 2 

This phase concerns people at high risk. From 18 January 2021, people aged 75 and over who do not reside in ESMS or nursing homes can be vaccinated. This phase will last until the end of February and concerns 5 million people. From the end of February, the vaccination will be open to people aged 65 to 74.

Phase 3 
This phase concerns people who are more vulnerable than the general population. It will take place in the spring and include the following people.

 People aged 50 to 64.
 Precarious people and the staff accompanying them.
 People living in closed places or in collective accommodation.
 People with co-morbidities (COPD, hypertension, coronary heart disease, renal failure, cancers less than 3 years old or in progress, Trisomy 21, type I and II diabetes, obesity, people who have received organ or cell transplants strains).
 People working in an essential sector and in contact with the public (education, security, food.).

Phase 4 and 5 
Phases 4 and 5 will allow vaccination to be widely opened to those over 18.

Progress to date 
Daily updates are provided by Santé Publique France.

Vaccine deliveries 
The following table details the weekly number of authorized vaccines delivered to France since the start of the crisis. Among the suppliers, AstraZeneca is by far the most late compared to its initial commitments. In the 1st quarter of 2021, AstraZeneca is expected to deliver 30 million doses to the European Union, while the initial forecast was 120 million.

See also 
COVID-19 pandemic in France
Deployment of COVID-19 vaccines
 EU Digital COVID Certificate

References

Vaccination
France
2021 in France
2020 in France
Emmanuel Macron